Doctor Down Under was an Australian television comedy series based on a set of books by Richard Gordon about the misadventures of a group of doctors. The series follows directly from its predecessor Doctor on the Go, and was produced by the Seven Network in association with the Paul Dainty organization and broadcast in 1979.

Writers for the Doctor Down Under episodes were Bernard McKenna, Jon Watkins, and Bernie Sharp. The episodes were directed by William G. Stewart and John Eastway; all episodes were produced by Stewart.

Plot
When Dr Duncan Waring and Dr Dick Stuart-Clark take up positions at St. Barnabas hospital in Sydney, they wreak havoc for the local medical staff, especially for Professor Beaumont, who is Professor of Surgery, and Dr Maurice Griffin, a surgeon with whom they share their office. The nurses at the hospital, however, find Dr Waring and Dr Stuart-Clark charming, as the two English doctors continue their pursuit of women.

Cast
 Robin Nedwell as Dr Duncan Waring
 Geoffrey Davies as Dr Dick Stuart-Clark
 Frank Wilson as Dr Beaumont
 John Derum as Dr Maurice Griffin
 Jennifer Mellet as Linda Franklin, Duncan's medical secretary
 Joan Bruce as Sister Cummings
 Ken Wayne as Professor Wilkinson, Professor of Anaesthesia

Guest stars
 John Bluthal, who  guest-starred in the episode "I Gotta Horse"
 David Foster as Dr Travers
 Roger Ward as Mr Phillips
 Sheila Kennelly as Mrs Ellis

Episode list
 "Thanks for the Memory" — written by Bernard McKenna and Jon Watkins
 "If a Job's Worth Doing" — written by Bernard McKenna
 "A Bird in the Hand" — written by Jon Watkins
 "I Gotta Horse" — written by Bernie Sharp
 "The Hawaiian Operation" — written by Jon Watkins
 "The More We Are Together" — written by Jon Watkins
 "It's All in the Mind" — written by Bernie Sharp
 "If You Can't Beat Em..." — written by Jon Watkins
 "Alias Clark and Waring" — written by Jon Watkins
 "Impatients" — written by Bernard McKenna
 "The Sydney Surprise" — written by Jon Watkins
 "The Name of the Game" — written by Bernard McKenna
 "Identity Crisis" — written by Bernard McKenna

Location of St Barnabas Hospital
The building used as the fictional St Barnabas Hospital is Hornsby Hospital, in Hornsby, Sydney, New South Wales, Australia.

UK broadcast
Doctor Down Under aired in the United Kingdom on ITV during 1980-1981.

 Granada Television was the first ITV region to broadcast the series on Saturday 5 January.
 Southern Television was the second to start the series from Tuesday 12 February 1980. 
 Anglia Television started the series from April broadcasting at 15.15 slot.

Nearly all the other ITV stations picked up the series during between June and July 1980, but it was not fully networked:
ATV and Westward broadcast it 17.15
Yorkshire Television broadcast it 10.30
Border, Grampian, Granada, HTV, STV, and Southern broadcast it 19.30.

Last ITV area to broadcast the series was London: London Weekend Television, which produced the previous series in the Doctor franchise, screened Doctor Down Under from January 1981.

DVD release
All 13 episodes of Doctor Down Under have been released as a two Disc DVD set by Umbrella Entertainment in Australia (2007).

References

External links

 Doctor Down Under opening titles
 Doctor Down Under — featured in "Memorable TV Australian Shows"

1979 in Australian television
1980 in Australian television
1979 Australian television series debuts
1980 Australian television series endings
Australian television sitcoms
Doctor in the House
English-language television shows
Australian medical television series
Television shows set in New South Wales
Seven Network original programming